Burntside may refer to:

Burntside, Minnesota, unincorporated community in Saint Louis County, Minnesota, United States
Burntside Lake, 3 miles northwest of Ely, Minnesota, in St. Louis County, Minnesota, United States
Burntside Lodge, resort located on Burntside Lake several miles out of Ely, Minnesota, United States
Burntside River, river of Minnesota, United States
Burntside State Forest, state forest located near the town of Ely in Lake and St. Louis counties, Minnesota, United States
Dead River (Burntside River), river of Minnesota, United States

See also
Bournside
Burneside
Burnside (disambiguation)

vo:Burntside